African Electronic Dance Music is an album by South African DJ and music producer Sun-El Musician, released by EL World Music on October 29, 2021. It features appearances by Ami Faku , Msaki, Yamisava, Bholoja, Simmy , and Linos Rosetta.

Musically, African Electronic Dance Music is an Electronic, and Afro-house record.

Critical reception

Year-end lists

Singles 
"Higher", which features South African singer Simmy, was released as the album's lead single on September 17, 2021.

Awards 
African Electronic Dance Music received three nominations; Album of the Year,  Male Artist of the Year, and Best Dance Album at the 28th South African Music Awards.

|-
| rowspan="3"| 2022
| rowspan="3"| African Electronic Dance Music
| Album of the Year 
| 
|-
| Male Artist of the Year 
| 
|-
| Best Dance Album 
|

Track listing

Personnel 
Credits for African Electronic Dance Music adapted  from Genius.
 Sun-El Musician  - Producer , writer 
 Ami Faku - Writer

Release history

References 

2021 albums
Sun-El Musician albums
EL World Music albums